Yerraicheruvu is a village located in Iragavaram mandal of West Godavari district, Andhra Pradesh, India.

References

Villages in West Godavari district